Esmark Glacier is a glacier flowing into the west part of Jossac Bight on the south coast of South Georgia. It was named by the Norwegian expedition under Olaf Holtedahl, 1927–28, most likely for Jens Esmark, professor of mineralogy at the University of Kristiania (Oslo), Norway.
To the northwest is Mount Cunningham.

See also
 List of glaciers in the Antarctic
 Glaciology

References 

Glaciers of South Georgia